Articles (arranged alphabetically) related to Seychelles include:

. 
.sc (Internet country code top-level domain)lloi

0–9 
1981 Seychelles coup d'état attempt
1992 CECAFA Cup
1994 CECAFA Cup
2011 Seychelles First Division
2011 in Seychellois football
2011 Indian Ocean Island Games 
2015 CAF Beach Soccer Championship
2017 in Seychelles
2017 Africa Cup of Nations qualification Group J
2019 Africa Cup of Nations qualification Group E

A 
Action of 30 March 2010
Action of 1 April 2010 
Agriculture in Seychelles
Air Seychelles
Air Seychelles destinations
Aldabra 
Aldabra Group
Alphonse Airport
Alphonse Atoll
Alphonse Group
Amirante Islands
Anonyme Island
Anse aux Pins
Anse Boileau
Anse Etoile
Anse Lazio
Anse Réunion FC
Anse Royale
Aride Island
Godfrey Denis Armel
Arthur Grimble (1936-1942)
Astove Island 
Astove Island Airport
Assumption Island
Assumption Island Airport
Anti-Corruption Commission Seychelles
Au Cap
Aurore Island, Seychelles

B 
Baie Lazare
Baie Sainte Anne
Battle of Mahé
Beau Vallon
Beau Vallon
Bel Air, Seychelles
Bel Ombre (Seychelles)
Bird Island, Seychelles
Bird Island Airport
Bishop of Seychelles
Booby Island, Seychelles
Boudeuse Island
Bruce Greatbatch (1969-1973)

C 
Cabinet of Seychelles
Cachée Island
Canterbury University (Seychelles)
Cascade, Seychelles
Catholic Church in Seychelles
Central Bank of Seychelles
Cerf Island
Charles Richard Mackey O'Brien (1912-1918)
China–Seychelles relations
Chauve Souris, Mahé
Chauve Souris, Praslin
Coat of arms of Seychelles
Cocos Island, Seychelles
Coëtivy Island
Coëtivy Airport
Colin Allan (1973-1976)
Communications in Seychelles
Conception Island, Seychelles
Constitutional Court of Seychelles
Cosmoledo
Côte d'Or FC
Cousin Island
Cousine Island
Cricket in the Seychelles
Cuisine of Seychelles
Culture of Seychelles
Curieuse Island

D 
D'Arros Island
D'Arros Island Airport
Sir de Symons Honey (1928-1934)
Demographics of Seychelles
Denis Island
Desnoeufs Island
Desroches Island
Desroches Airport
Diplomatic missions of Seychelles
Districts of Seychelles

E 
Economy of Seychelles
Eden Island, Seychelles
Education in Seychelles
Elections in Seychelles
Elections in Seychelles
Electoral Commission of Seychelles
English language
Ernest Sweet-Escott (1903-1904)
Étoile Cay
Eustace Twisleton-Wykeham-Fiennes (1918-1921)
Eve Island, Seychelles

F 
Farquhar Airport
Farquhar Atoll
Farquhar Group
Félicité Island
Flag of Seychelles
Football at the 1979 Indian Ocean Island Games
Football at the 1993 Indian Ocean Island Games
Football at the 1998 Indian Ocean Island Games
Football at the 2003 Indian Ocean Island Games
Football at the 2011 Indian Ocean Island Games
Football at the 2015 Indian Ocean Island Games – Men
Football in Seychelles
Foreign relations of Seychelles
Foresters (Mont Fleuri)
France-Albert René
France–Seychelles Maritime Boundary Agreement
Franco-Seychellois
Frederick Crawford (colonial administrator) (1951-1953)
Frégate Island
Frégate Island Airport
French language

G 
Geography of Seychelles
Glacis, Seychelles
Glorioso Islands
Gordon James Lethem (1934-1936)
Grand' Anse (Mahe)
Grand' Anse (Praslin)
Grande Soeur
Granitic Seychelles

H 
High Commission of the Seychelles, London
Hinduism in Seychelles
History of Seychelles
Hodoul Island
Hugh Norman-Walker (1967-1969)

I 
Île Platte
India–Seychelles relations
Indo-Seychellois
International School Seychelles
Islam in Seychelles
Island Conservation Society
Islands of Seychelles

J 
James Mancham
James Michel
John Kingsmill Thorp (1958-1961)
Joseph Aloysius Byrne (1921-1927)
Julian Asquith, 2nd Earl of Oxford and Asquith (1962-1967)

K 
Kenya–Seychelles relations •
Koste Seselwa • 
Koste Seselwa

L 
La Digue • 
La Digue and Inner Islands •
Ladob •
Lady Denison-Pender Shoal •
La Flèche (P32) •
La Passe FC •
La Riviere Anglaise • 
Ladob • 
Languages of Seychelles •
Legends of the coco de mer •
Les Mamelles •
Light Stars FC •
Ligne Aérienne Seychelles • 
List of airlines of Seychelles • 
List of airports in Seychelles •
List of amphibians of Seychelles •
List of banks in Seychelles • 
List of birds of the Seychelles •
List of butterflies of Seychelles •
List of cities in Seychelles •
List of companies of Seychelles •
List of diplomatic missions in Seychelles • 
List of fish on stamps of Seychelles • 
List of flag bearers for Seychelles at the Olympics •
List of football clubs in Seychelles •
List of colonial governors and administrators of Seychelles • 
List of lighthouses in Seychelles •
List of mammals in the Seychelles • 
List of museums in Seychelles •
List of national parks of Seychelles • 
List of political parties in Seychelles • 
List of presidents of Seychelles • 
List of rivers of Seychelles • 
List of Seychellois musicians •
List of Seychellois people •
List of Seychellois records in athletics •
List of supermarket chains in Seychelles •
List of universities in Seychelles •
Long Island, Seychelles

M 
Mahé, Seychelles •
Mahé highlands and surrounding areas Important Bird Area •
Malaysia–Seychelles relations • 
Malcolm Stevenson (1927) •
Mamelles Island •
Marianne Island •
Marie Louise Island •
Marie Louise Island Airport •
Mascarene Plateau •
Military of Seychelles • 
Mineral industry of Seychelles • 
Minister for Foreign Affairs (Seychelles) • 
Ministry of Foreign Affairs (Seychelles) •
Mont Buxton • 
Mont Fleuri • 
Montagne Glacis Important Bird Area •
Montea •
Morne Seychellois •
Moyenne Island • 
Music of Seychelles •
MV Beluga Nomination incident

N 
National Agricultural and Fisheries Policy • 
National Assembly of Seychelles • 
National Library of the Seychelles • 
National Youth Service (Seychelles) • 
National Youth Service (Seychelles) • 
Nature Protection Trust of Seychelles • 
Nature Seychelles •
North Island, Seychelles •
North Korea–Seychelles relations •
Northern Coral Group •
Northern Dynamo FC

O 
Operation Flowers are Blooming •
Orion Air •
Outer Islands (Seychelles)

P 
People's Party (Seychelles) •
People's Stadium, Seychelles •
Percy Selwyn-Clarke (1947-1951) •
Perseverance Island, Seychelles •
Petite Soeur  •
Picard Island •
Plaisance, Seychelles •
Platte Island Airport • 
Pointe La Rue •
Poivre Atoll • 
Politics of Seychelles • 
Port Glaud •
Port Island, Seychelles •
Port of Victoria (Seychelles) •
Postage stamps and postal history of Seychelles • 
Praslin •
Praslin Island Airport •
Praslin National Park and surrounding areas Important Bird Area • 
Prime Minister of Seychelles •
Providence Atoll
PS Constant •
PS Topaz •
Public holidays in Seychelles

Q

R 
Rat Island (Seychelles) •
Red Star FC (Seychelles) •
Religion in Seychelles •
Remire Island • 
Remire Island Airport •
Remire Reef •
Revengers FC •
Roche Caiman •
Roman Catholic Diocese of Port Victoria • 
Roman Catholicism in Seychelles • 
Romainville Island, Seychelles •
Round Island, Mahe •
Rugby union in the Seychelles • 
Russia–Seychelles relations

S 
Saffron rice •
Saint Louis, Seychelles • 
Saint Louis Suns United • 
Sainte Anne Marine National Park • 
Sèche Island •
Sega music • 
Seychelles at the 2009 World Championships in Athletics •
Seychelles at the 2011 World Championships in Athletics •
Seychelles at the 2013 World Championships in Athletics •
Seychelles at the 2015 World Championships in Athletics •
Seychelles at the 2017 World Championships in Athletics •
Seychelles at the Commonwealth Games •
Seychelles at the 1994 Commonwealth Games •
Seychelles at the 2006 Commonwealth Games •
Seychelles at the 2010 Commonwealth Games •
Seychelles at the 2014 Commonwealth Games •
Seychelles at the Olympics •
Seychelles at the 1980 Summer Olympics • 
Seychelles at the 1984 Summer Olympics • 
Seychelles at the 1992 Summer Olympics • 
Seychelles at the 1996 Summer Olympics • 
Seychelles at the 2000 Summer Olympics • 
Seychelles at the 2004 Summer Olympics • 
Seychelles at the 2008 Summer Olympics • 
Seychelles at the 2012 Summer Olympics •
Seychelles at the 2016 Summer Olympics •
Seychelles at the Paralympics •
Seychelles at the 1992 Summer Paralympics •
Seychelles at the 2016 Summer Paralympics • 
Seychelles at the 2011 World Aquatics Championships • 
Seychelles at the 2013 World Aquatics Championships •
Seychelles at the 2015 World Aquatics Championships •
Seychelles at the 2017 World Aquatics Championships •
Seychelles Broadcasting Corporation • 
Seychelles Chess Championship • 
Seychelles Child Development Study •
Seychelles Coast Guard •
Seychelles community in the EU •
Seychelles Cricket Association • 
Seychelles Democratic Party • 
Seychelles FA Cup • 
Seychelles Federation of Workers' Unions • 
Seychelles First Division •
Seychelles Football Federation •
Seychelles Hockey Federation • 
Seychelles Institute of Management •
Seychelles International Airport •
Seychelles International Repatriation Onward Program
Seychelles International Safari Air • 
Seychelles Islands Foundation • 
Seychelles League • 
Seychelles Marketing Board • 
Seychelles Medical and Dental Association •
Seychelles Medical and Dental Council •
Seychelles microcontinent •
Seychelles Movement for Democracy • 
Seychelles Nation • 
Seychelles National Archives •
Seychelles national basketball team • 
Seychelles national beach soccer team •
Seychelles national cricket team •
Seychelles national football team •
Seychelles national under-17 football team • 
Seychelles National Movement •
Seychelles National Party • 
Seychelles national rugby union team •
Seychelles Natural History Museum •
Seychelles News Agency •
Seychelles Olympic and Commonwealth Games Association •
Seychelles Party • 
Seychelles People's Defence Force Air Wing • 
Seychelles People's Progressive Front • 
Seychelles Polytechnic •
Seychelles Port Authority •
Seychelles Securities Exchange (Trop-X) •
Seychelles Scout Association • 
Seychelles–Tanzania Maritime Boundary Agreement •
Seychelles Time •
Seychelles Tourism Board •
Seychelles–United States relations • 
Seychelles Workers Union •
Seychellense Ambassador to China •
Seychellense Ambassador to United States •
Seychellois Creole • 
Seychellois Creole people •
Seychellois constitutional commission election, 1992 • 
Seychellois constitutional referendum, 1992 •
Seychellois constitutional referendum, 1993 •
Seychellois general election, 1979 •
Seychellois general election, 1993 •
Seychellois general election, 1998 •
Seychellois parliamentary election, 1948 •
Seychellois parliamentary election, 1951 •
Seychellois parliamentary election, 1953 •
Seychellois parliamentary election, 1957 •
Seychellois parliamentary election, 1963 •
Seychellois parliamentary election, 1967 •
Seychellois parliamentary election, 1970 •
Seychellois parliamentary election, 1974 •
Seychellois parliamentary election, 1983 •
Seychellois parliamentary election, 1987 •
Seychellois parliamentary election, 2002 • 
Seychellois parliamentary election, 2007 •
Seychellois parliamentary election, 2011 •
Seychellois parliamentary election, 2016 •
Seychellois passport • 
Seychellois presidential election, 1984 •
Seychellois presidential election, 1989 •
Seychellois presidential election, 2001 • 
Seychellois presidential election, 2006 • 
Seychellois presidential election, 2011 •
Seychellois presidential election, 2015 •
Seychellois rupee • 
Seychellois units of measurement •
Shark chutney • 
Silhouette Island • 
Sino-Seychellois •
Slavery in Seychelles • 
Soleil Island •
Songoula • 
Souris Island •
Southern Coral Group •
Sport in Seychelles •
Stade d’Amitié • 
Stade Linité • 
State House (Seychelles) •
St Francis FC (Seychelles) •
St. Francis of Assisi Church, Baie Lazare •
St. François Atoll •
St. Joseph Atoll •
St Michel United FC • 
St. Pierre Island, Farquhar •
St. Pierre Island, Praslin •
St Roch United •
Ste. Anne Island •
Ste Anne Marine National Park •
Super Magic Brothers

T 
Takamaka •
Tamil Seychellois •
Telecommunications in Seychelles •
Telephone numbers in Seychelles •
Thérèse Island •
The Lions FC •
Thorpe Bank • 
Tourism in Seychelles • 
Transport in Seychelles

U 
United States drone base in Seychelles
University of Seychelles

V 
Vache Island, Seychelles •
Vallée de Mai • 
Vanilla Islands •
Vice President of Seychelles • 
Victoria • 
Victoria Botanical Gardens •
Visa policy of Seychelles •
Visa requirements for Seychellois citizens

W 
Walter Edward Davidson (1904-1912) • 
Whaling in Seychelles •
Wildlife of Seychelles • 
Wizard Reef •
Women in Seychelles

X

Y

Z

See also 
 Outline of Seychelles

 
Seychelles